Ryan Latham (born November 18, 1982 in Dallas, Texas) is an American soccer player who last played forward for the New England Revolution in Major League Soccer.

Latham played college soccer for Southern Methodist University from 2001 to 2004.  During his four seasons he appeared in 70 games, scoring 22 goals and assisting on 8.

He was selected in the second round, 21st overall in the 2005 MLS Supplemental Draft by the New England Revolution.  He played irregularly during his rookie 2005 season and then was injured for much of 2006.  Perhaps Latham is most notable for scoring the equalizing goal for New England in a mid-season friendly with Scottish giants Celtic Football Club which finished 1-1. Late in the 2006 season, he was waived by the Revolution.

References 
 "#30 - Ryan Latham - F", New England Revolution official player bio.

1982 births
Living people
American soccer players
New England Revolution players
SMU Mustangs men's soccer players
Major League Soccer players
New England Revolution draft picks
Association football forwards